is a song by Japanese singer-songwriter Gen Hoshino. It was released on 5 October 2016 through Victor Entertainment and Speedstar Records as Hoshino's ninth single, and served as the theme song for the TBS television series The Full-Time Wife Escapist, in which he starred alongside Yui Aragaki.

Commercial performance

"Koi" was a commercial success in Japan. The single debuted at number two on the Oricon Singles Chart and the Billboard Japan Hot 100 chart, before peaking at number one on the Japan Hot 100 the week after, becoming Hoshino's first number one song on the Japan Hot 100 chart. Since then, it has topped the chart for a total of 11 non-consecutive weeks and has spent 136 weeks on the chart , making it the song with most weeks at number one and the ninth for most weeks on the chart. It won Song of the Year by Download at the 31st Japan Gold Disc Award, and topped the Japan Hot 100-year-end list in 2017. The CD single has been certified Platinum by the Recording Industry Association of Japan (RIAJ), while the song has been certified Million. Overall, it has sold over 2.3 million copies in Japan.

Music video

The accompanying music video, styled in black, white, and yellow and directed by Kazuaki Seki, features Hoshino and Elevenplay dancers performing a series of dance moves, dubbed the "Koi Dance", as choreographed by Perfume choreographer, Mikiko Mizuno. Performed by The Full-Time Wife Escapist cast at the end of every episode, the dance became popular in Japan and has since been widely covered on YouTube and social media. To date, the music video has been viewed over 280 million times on YouTube.

Track listing

Charts

Weekly charts

Year-end charts

Sales and certifications

Release history

See also
List of best-selling singles in Japan
List of Hot 100 number-one singles of 2016 (Japan)
List of Hot 100 number-one singles of 2017 (Japan)

References

2016 songs
2016 singles
Billboard Japan Hot 100 number-one singles
Japanese television drama theme songs
Japanese-language songs
LGBT-related songs